Richard Smithwicke (1804 – 20 November 1860) was an Irish Repeal Association politician.

References

External links
 

UK MPs 1841–1847
Members of the Parliament of the United Kingdom for County Kilkenny constituencies (1801–1922)
Irish Repeal Association MPs
1804 births
1860 deaths